Mahabad-e Olya (also Romanized as Mahābād-e ‘Olyā; also known as Mahābād-e Bālā) is a village in Kakhk Rural District, Kakhk District, Gonabad County, Razavi Khorasan Province, Iran. At the 2006 census, its population was 62, in 22 families.

References 

Populated places in Gonabad County